Jaswinder Singh Brar was an Indian politician and was Cabinet minister of Punjab in Prakash Singh Badal ministry (1977–80).

Jaswinder Singh Brar was a Punjabi politician who became a member of the Punjab Legislative Assembly twice by winning an assembly election in 1972 and then in 1977 from Kotkapura Assembly Constituency on the ticket of Shiromani Akali Dal. In 1972 he became the Leader of opposition but due to differences with high command he resigned and was succeeded by Prakash Singh Badal.

In 1977 when Shiromani Akali Dal formed the government in Punjab he became the Minister of Coopration and held the position until President's rule was declared in Punjab.

He also remained the President of All India Sikh Students Federation.

References

1938 births
State cabinet ministers of Punjab, India
Living people
People from Faridkot, Punjab
Punjab, India MLAs 1972–1977
Punjab, India MLAs 1977–1980
Shiromani Akali Dal politicians